The 1906–07 South Africa tour of Europe was a collection of friendly rugby union games undertaken by the South Africa national team against the four British Home Nation teams. The tour also took in several matches against British and Irish club, county and invitational teams before finally travelling to France to play the national team.

This was the inaugural South Africa tour and is recognised as the event that coined the phrase Springboks as a nickname for the South African team. The sports-themed South African novelty song "The Springboks' Waltz" was released in 1906 to commemorate the tour.

The 1906 Springboks were "the first national team to utilize the 3–4–1 formation".

The tour was extremely successful for the South Africans which helped garner respect from the Northern Hemisphere teams and established South Africa as a formidable rugby playing country. In the tests played the team would only lose to Scotland and drew against England. The South African defeat of Wales was a shock to many critics and ended the international careers of some of the greatest Welsh players of the time. Out of 29 matches played, South Africa won 26, lost two and drew one.

Touring party

Management
Manager: Cecil Carden
Captain: Paul Roos

Full backs
Arthur Burmeister (Western Province)
Steve Joubert (Western Province)
Arthur Marsberg (Griqualand West)

Three-quarters
Sydney de Melker (Griqualand West)
HA de Villiers (Western Province)
Jack Hirsch (Eastern Province)
Japie Krige (Western Province)
Japie le Roux (Western Province)
Bob Loubser (Western Province)
Andrew Morkel (Transvaal)
Anton Stegmann (Western Province)

Half backs
Harold 'Paddy' Carolin (Western Province)
Uncle Dobbin (Griqualand West)
Dirk Jackson (Western Province)

Forwards
Daniel Brink (Western Province)
Douglas Brookes (Border)
Adam Francis Burdett (Western Province)
William Burger (Border)
Henry Daneel (Western Province)
Pietie le Roux (Western Province)
Dietlof Maré (Western Province)
Rajah Martheze (Griqualand West)
William Millar (Western Province)
Douglas Morkel (Transvaal)
William Morkel (Transvaal)
William Allan Neill (Border)
Klondyke Raaff (Griqualand West)
Hubert Reid (Transvaal)
Paul Roos (Western Province)

Match summary
Complete list of matches played by the Springboks in Europe:

 Test matches

Match details

Devon

Newport

Glamorgan

Scotland

Ireland

Wales

Before the game hopes were high that the Welsh would be able to see off the South African threat. As one commentator wrote, "There was nothing in the South African's play to forbid Welsh hopes of repeating their success of last season...", harking back to Wales' famous victory over the All Blacks. When a Glamorgan XV team, which contained many Welsh caps that were to face South Africa, could only manage a drew against Gloucester, it caused some people to re-think the team's chances of winning. This caused an outcry for Welsh star, Gwyn Nicholls, to come out of international retirement to face South Africa. Even the South African players' voiced their disappointment at not facing Nicholls on the pitch. When Billy Trew withdrew from the Glamorgan XV against Monmouthshire on 22 November, Nicholls was the surprise replacement, and a few days later Nicholls told the Daily Mirror that he intended to "have a shot at the Springboks"

On the day of the match, South Africa were without some of their star players, including lead try scorer Stegmann, who had suffered a leg strain in the Belfast encounter. However, captain and talisman Paul Roos was back in the squad though sporting a heavy pad on his injured shoulder. The weather on the day was dry and the hard pitch suited the visitors. After an aggressive but blunt opening from the hosts, the South Africans found their pace and quickly took advantage. By half time the tourist were 6–0 ahead with tries from Joubert and Loubser. Gwyn Nicholls had a particularly poor game, wasting a panicked kick from Marsberg in the first half and throughout the game he and Gabe were so tightly marked that they were ineffective. In the second half it was a Nicholls error that handed the Springboks their third try when he caught a high ball safely, only to release it into open play. 'Klondyke' Raaff dribbled the ball away and scored a try that Joubert duly converted. The final result was 11–0 to the visitors; the majority of Welsh crowd were silenced by such a terrible result, though enough good-will was shown to carry captain Roos, and the constantly impressive Marsberg from the pitch.

After the games there were many ramifications for the Welsh team. The papers stated that the weakness shown by the forwards, and too many old players in the pack, were the reasons for the poor Welsh display. The Welsh Rugby Union reacted to the press comments by dropping many of the players from international rugby. Those players that would never again represent their country included, Dai Jones, Will Joseph, Gwyn Nicholls and Jack Williams; just one year after the legendary game against the All Blacks.

England

Monmouthshire

Llanelli

The Springboks had a magnificent reception from a crowd of 15,000. The South Africans started on an attack, but the Llanelli forwards soon rallied, resulting in a try that placed the Welshmen ahead. For the remainder of the first half the Springboks persistently pressed, eventually succeeding in piercing the Welsh defence, resulting in a converted try.

The Springboks were leading 5 to 3 at the interval. After the start of the second half the Welsh made a determined effort, but the Springboks forwards gained supremacy which they maintained. Towards the end of the game the Springbok scored with a succession of backline movements, resulting in two tries for Loubser. One of these tries was converted and a penalty goal was added, for the 16 to 3 final score.

Cardiff

France

France does not include this match in its official records and no caps were awarded.

Bibliography

References

1906 rugby union tours
1907 rugby union tours
1906
1906
1906
1906
1906
1906
1906 in South African rugby union
1907 in South African rugby union
1906–07 in English rugby union
1906–07 in Scottish rugby union
1906–07 in French rugby union
1906–07 in Irish rugby union
1906–07 in Welsh rugby union